In mathematics, Meixner polynomials (also called discrete Laguerre polynomials) are a family of discrete orthogonal polynomials introduced by . They are given in terms of binomial coefficients and the (rising) Pochhammer symbol by

See also
Kravchuk polynomials

References

Orthogonal polynomials